Major General Tunku Ismail Idris Abdul Majid Abu Bakar Iskandar ibni Sultan Ibrahim Ismail (Jawi: تونكو إسماعيل إدريس عبدالمجيد أبو بكر إسكندر ابن سلطان إبراهيم إسماعيل; born 30 June 1984) is the Tunku Mahkota (Crown Prince) of Johor, heir apparent and first in line of succession to the throne of Johor. He is the eldest son of the current Sultan of Johor, Sultan Ibrahim Ismail and his consort Permaisuri (Queen) of Johor, Raja Zarith Sofiah. He is the grandson of both Sultan Iskandar of Johor and Sultan Idris Shah II of Perak.

He is also a half third cousin of Nazrin Shah of Perak (the current Sultan of Perak) since both share a common male ancestor (Idris Shah I of Perak). He is also a grandnephew as well as nephew by marriage of Abdullah of Pahang, the Sultan of Pahang and an 11th cousin of Tengku Muhammad Ismail, the crown prince of Terengganu since they both share a common male ancestor (Tun Habib Abdul Majid).

Biography

Early life and education
Tunku Ismail completed his early education at Sekolah Sri Utama and Sekolah Rendah Kebangsaan St. Joseph in Johor Bahru.  He subsequently received lower secondary education at the Australian International School in Singapore and continued with his higher secondary studies at Hale School in Perth, Western Australia, until 2002. Tunku Ismail is the eldest among six siblings. Like his father, Tunku Ismail has no tertiary (academic) qualification.

Tunku Ismail was appointed Raja Muda (literally means "Younger King," but taken to mean as second Heir Apparent or son of the Crown Prince) on 8 April 2006 by his grandfather, the late Sultan of Johor, and placing him second in line to the throne (Now first in line after the passing of Sultan Iskandar). Tunku Ismail was appointed as the Tunku Mahkota of Johor on 28 January 2010.

Career and interests
Following a family tradition of getting trained in armed forces, with his late grandfather in the Malaysian Army and father in the US Army, Tunku Ismail aspired for a career in the Indian Armed Forces. In July 2003, he enrolled as a cadet officer in the Indian Military Academy (IMA), India's premier military training school located at Dehradun. He was commissioned as a lieutenant in December 2004 and absorbed into the Indian Army. He was promoted to the rank of captain in December 2007. His father and grandfather also had trained at IMA.

The Malaysian prince is the first foreigner to lead a unit of Indian Army in the Indian Republic Day Parade. On 26 January 2007, with a rank of captain in Indian Army, he led a mounted column of Jaipur-based 61 Cavalry regiment to salute president of India A. P. J. Abdul Kalam during the Republic Day celebrations. The president himself chose Tunku Ismail to lead the unit of around 400 men of the world's only non-ceremonial horse-mounted cavalry. The parade was witnessed by chief guest of the day president of Russia Vladimir Putin and his entourage, along with other dignitaries of Indian politics and military amidst tight security. Tunku Ismail's father Tunku Ibrahim Ismail flew in from Johor Bahru on 23 January 2007 to be present at the celebrations while his son added a chapter to the history of Indian Army.

A polo enthusiast, Tunku Ismail is a skilful horse rider. He was bestowed the Best in Riding award among IMA cadets between 2003 and 2004. He is also a polo player for his regiment and has won many trophies. In football, he is the owner of Johor FC.

The prince is also a sports car enthusiast. All of his cars are registered under the same licence plate of "TMJ", an abbreviation from the title Tunku Mahkota Johor which is also his nickname as addressed informally by Malaysians within and outside Johor.

He is noted for his religious moderation and veiled criticism of more conservative Muslims who denounced him for shaking hands with women in 2016.

On 2 December 2022, Tunku Ismail was installed as the Chancellor of Universiti Tun Hussein Onn Malaysia (UTHM) at the first session of the university’s 22nd convocation at Dewan Sultan Ibrahim.

Sports

As President of Johor Football Association
His Royal Highness the DYAM Tunku Mahkota (Crown Prince) of Johor, Tunku Ismail Idris ibni Sultan Ibrahim has been appointed as the President of Johor Football Association (PBNJ). The EGM held in Johor Bahru saw the Crown Prince appointed as the new president replacing the former, Jais Sarday. Among his plans to help bring back Johorean football to its former glory, the Crown Prince merged the Johor teams (which previously were Johor FC, MBJB and MP Muar) into only one where all of the players wear the Jengking (Scorpion) Team Jersey. .

Tunku Ismail's leadership on the club Johor Darul Ta'zim F.C also oversaw its success as the first Southeast Asian club to lift the AFC Cup in 2015.

As FAM Presidential Advisor and President of FAM 
In 2014, the Football Association of Malaysia (FAM)  appointed the Tunku Ismail Sultan Ibrahim as an advisor to the previous FAM president, his uncle, Sultan Abdullah of Pahang. Tunku Ismail assisted and worked hand in hand with FAM in improving the quality of football within the country, particularly with the national team as well as the junior teams.

As predicted, there were several concerns about the news, particularly with Tunku Ismail having lost the FAM presidency election to Tengku Abdullah earlier that year. Besides that, he had been extremely vocal with his criticisms on the nation's footballing body. However, the then Johor FA president was extremely optimistic about the new role, claiming that he will only be pushing for the betterment of football within the country.

He was elected as President of FAM for a short term from 2017 to 2018.

Controversies

Alleged assault
On 24 October 2008, reports surfaced about a confrontation and a royal scuffle which allegedly occurred in a nightclub at Crowne Plaza Hotel in Kuala Lumpur between two princes. Tunku Nadzimuddin, a member of the Negeri Sembilan household, filed a police report accusing of a Johor royal whom he identified the culprit to be Tunku Ismail; for initiating the confrontation and assaulting him in the face and head. A friend of Tunku Nadzimuddin, Shamshudhuha Ishak, a lawyer, filed another police report accusing of Tunku Ismail's bodyguards of assaulting him and losing two teeth in the process.

The following September, Tunku Nadzimuddin lodged a complaint against the police and the Attorney-General chambers for not responding to the police report that he had made earlier for a RM50 million monetary settlement over the alleged episode. In a press interview, Tunku Nadzimuddin claimed that he was roughed up by Tunku Ismail and his bodyguards after the a friend of Tunku Ismail called Tunku Nadzimuddin that he had wanted to apologise over a bottle-throwing incident, while Tunku Nadzimuddin was partying. Tunku Nadzimuddin looked for Tunku Ismail with Shamshudhuha, but they quickly assaulted by Tunku Ismail's bodyguards. Shamshudhuha was beaten unconscious, while Tunku Nadzimuddin was threatened by Tunku Ismail with a pistol pointing to his head, and led to a hotel room where they were confined. The police later arrived after Tunku Nadzimuddin called for his mother. The Johor royalty denied Tunku Nadzimuddin's claims, and stated that Tunku Ismail was barred from meeting Tunku Nadzimuddin that night for security reasons.

Personal life
On 24 October 2014, Tunku Ismail married a 21-years-old commoner Che' Puan Besar Khaleeda at Istana Bukit Serene in a private ceremony. The solemnisation ceremony was performed by Johor mufti Dato' Mohd Tahrir Samsudin. The royal wedding took place at the Istana Besar.

Khaleeda, daughter of Bustamam Daud and Aziyah Abdul Aziz, is the youngest of five siblings and was born in Kuala Lumpur.

The couple's first child, a daughter named Her Highness Tunku Khalsom Aminah Sofiah, was born on 25 June 2016. Their second child, a son named His Royal Highness Tunku Iskandar Abdul Jalil Abu Bakar Ibrahim, was born 14 October 2017. A third child and second son, His Highness Tunku Abu Bakar Ibrahim, was born on 17 July 2019. A fourth child and second daughter, Her Highness Tunku Zahrah Zarith Aziyah, was born on 21 April 2021.

Honours 

  Royal Family Order of Johor:
 Second Class – Darjah Kerabat Yang Amat Dihormati Pangkat Kedua (DK II) on 8 April 2006.
 First Class – Darjah Kerabat Yang Amat Dihormati Pangkat Pertama (DK I) on 11 April 2009.
  Order of the Crown of Johor : 
 Companion – Darjah Mahkota Johor Yang Amat Mulia Pangkat Ketiga Setia Mahkota Johor (SMJ) on 8 April 2004.
 Knight Grand Commander – Pangkat Pertama Darjah Mahkota Johor Yang Amat Mulia, Seri Paduka Mahkota Johor (SPMJ) on 8 April 2005.
  Order of the Loyalty of Sultan Ismail (Johor) :
 Knight Grand Commander - Pangkat Pertama Dato’ Sri Setia Sultan Ismail Johor (SSIJ) on 22 November 2010.
  Order of Sultan Ibrahim of Johor :
 Honourable Grand Knight - Pangkat Pertama Dato’ Sri Mulia Sultan Ibrahim Johor (SMIJ) on 30 March 2015.
  Sultan Ibrahim Coronation Medal (PSI, 1st class) on 23 March 2015.
  Sultan Ibrahim Medal (PSI I, 1st class) on 23 March 2017.

Issue

Ancestry
{{ahnentafel
|collapsed=yes |align=center
|boxstyle_1=background-color: #fcc;
|boxstyle_2=background-color: #fb9;
|boxstyle_3=background-color: #ffc;
|boxstyle_4=background-color: #bfc;
|boxstyle_5=background-color: #9fe;
|1= 1. Ismail bin Ibrahim, Crown Prince of Johor
|2= 2. Sultan Ibrahim Ismail of Johor
|3= 3. Raja Zarith Sofiah binti Idris
|4= 4. Sultan Iskandar bin Ismail of Johor
|5= 5. Enche' Besar Hajjah Kalsum binti Abdullah (née Josephine Ruby Trevorrow)
|6= 6. Sultan Idris Shah II of Perak
|7= 7. Raja Muzwin binti Raja Arif Shah
|8= 8. Sultan Ismail bin Ibrahim of Johor
|9= 9. Ungku Tun Amina binti Ungku Ahmad
|10= 10. Reginald George Trevorrow
|11= 11. Ruby May Alderman
|12= 12. Sultan Iskandar bin Idris of Perak
|13= 13. Raja Puteh Umi Kalsum binti Raja Kulop Muhammad Kramat
|14= 14. Raja Arif Shah bin Raja Haji Harun al-Rashid
|15= 15. Cik Puan Aziza binti Abdullah
|16= 16. Sultan Ibrahim bin Abu Bakar of Johor
|17= 17. Ungku Maimuna binti Ungku Abdul Majid
|18= 18. Ungku Ahmad bin Ungku Muhammad Khalid
|19= 19. Ungku Khadija binti Ungku Muhammad
|20= 
|21= 
|22= 22. Thomas Alderman
|23= 
|24= 24. Sultan Idris Shah I of Perak
|25= 25. Cik Ngah Manah binti Manda Duwayat
|26= 26. Raja Kulop Muhammad Kramat bin Raja Alang Iskandar
|27= 27. Che''' Ken Uda Sari binti Abdul Rahman
|28= 28. Raja Haji Harun al-Rashid bin Idris Murshid
|29= 29. Cik Haji Ngah Uteh Mariah binti Haji Sulaiman
|30= 30. Abdullah
|31= 
}}

See also
 Sultan of Johor
 Sultanate of Johor

References

Further reading
 Nadarajah, Nesalmar, Johore and the Origins of British Control, 1895–1914'', Arenabuku, 2000,

External links

1984 births
Living people
People from Johor Bahru
Malaysian people of Malay descent
Malaysian Muslims
Malaysian people of English descent
Malaysian people of Danish descent
Malaysian people of Chinese descent
House of Temenggong of Johor
Royal House of Perak
Heirs apparent
Malaysian expatriates in India
Indian Army officers
Malaysian military personnel
Malaysian polo players
Association football chairmen and investors
Sons of monarchs

First Classes of the Royal Family Order of Johor
Knights Grand Commander of the Order of the Crown of Johor